Suraag  is a 1982 Bollywood film, directed by Jag Mundhra, starring Sanjeev Kumar, Shabana Azmi, Parikshat Sahni and Gita Siddharth.

Cast 
 Sanjeev Kumar - Professor Saxena
 Shabana Azmi -  Sunita/Bela
 Parikshat Sahni - Dr. Ajay Gupta
 Gita Siddharth - Geeta
 Mac Mohan - Surinder Suri 
 Siddharth Kak - Paul Khanna
 Kavi Raz - Raju, Khanna's henchman (uncredited)
 Tina Munim - Qawaali Singer (Guest Appearance)
 Hema Malini - as herself (Guest Appearance)
 Jayshree T. - as herself (Guest Appearance)
 Rajesh Khanna - Qawaali Singer (Guest Appearance)
 Asha Sachdev - Renu Lamba (Guest Appearance)
 Mehmood - Father of prospective bride (Guest Appearance)
 Shubha Khote - Mother of prospective bride (Guest Appearance)

Storyline 

Prof. Saxena (Sanjeev Kumar) and Dr. Gupta (Parikshat Sahni) are friends living at Los Angeles (USA). The professor is married, while the doctor is unmarried. The doctor decides to get married, but to an ideal Indian woman with traditional values. On the advice of club owner Paul Khanna (Siddharth Kak), Gupta places a matrimonial advertisement in an Indian newspaper. He and the professor leave for Bombay to vet the responses and find himself a bride. After a few dates with women who answer to his advertisement in local newspapers, they select one who has good Indian traditional values, named Sunita (Shabana Azmi). After a few more meetings, the doctor and Sunita get married. The doctor leaves for the US assuring her that he will send her flight tickets soon. After a few weeks, the doctor sends Sunita her tickets for Los Angeles via New York. During the flight, another woman plants cocaine in Sunita's vanity case. Sunita clears customs without the drugs being detected and reaches New York. She calls the doctor to inform him of her arrival at New York and that she will board the flight to Los Angeles. The doctor, the professor, and the latter's wife Geeta (Gita Siddharth) wait at Los Angeles airport, but Sunita does not arrive as expected. Instead, they get a message that Sunita has been kidnapped.

Dr. Gupta pays a $200,000 ransom, but the kidnappers do not release his wife. Meanwhile, while watching a movie, Geeta spots Sunita onscreen as an extra in a song sequence. This leads to the discovery that Sunita is really Bela, an aspiring actress, whose behavior as a traditional Indian woman was merely the role of a lifetime. Saxena is determined to track down Sunita/Bela and her co-conspirators. He initially suspects Surinder Suri (Mac Mohan), a businessman in desperate need of cash to cover his gambling debts. Suri admits to having used Sunita as a patsy to smuggle cocaine into the country in order to recoup his losses. However, he claims to nothing about her disappearance, which has caused him severe problems as the cocaine has disappeared with her. But if he's telling the truth, where is Sunita/Bela? Has she disappeared of her own accord, or has she really been kidnapped?

Soundtrack
The songs were composed by Bappi Lahiri and penned by Kaifi Azmi.

References

External links
 

1982 films
1980s Hindi-language films
Films scored by Bappi Lahiri
Films directed by Jag Mundhra